The Vasco da Gama class is a class of frigates of the Portuguese Navy. Named in honor of the Portuguese explorer Vasco da Gama, the ships are based on the German MEKO 200 design, and are Portugal's major surface ships. Portugal operates three ships of this class, which were built in Hamburg by Blohm + Voss (B&V) and by Howaldtswerke-Deutsche Werft (HDW) in Kiel, using modular construction techniques.

The project for the construction of three frigates of this class was authorized by the Portuguese Government in 1985, five years after the request of the Portuguese Navy for the acquisition of new surface ships. According to Conway's, 60% of the funding for these ships came from NATO military aid. Similar ships have been built for the navies of Greece, Turkey, Australia and New Zealand.

Ships

Similar ships
MEKO
 - Greece
 - Australia and New Zealand
 - Turkey
 - Turkey

See also
 List of naval ship classes in service

References

 Vasco da Gama class, Portuguese Navy website
Conway's All the World's Fighting Ships 1947-1995

 
Frigate classes